Sirje may refer to:

Places
Širje, settlement in Slovenia
Veliko Širje, settlement in Slovenia

People
Sirje Eichelmann (born 1955), Estonian track and field athlete
Sirje Endre (born 1945), Estonian journalist, politician and entrepreneur
Sirje Kingsepp (born 1969), Estonian politician and reality TV participant
Sirje Roops (born 1992), Estonian footballer
Sirje Tamul (born 1951), Estonian historian
Sirje Tennosaar (1943–2021), Estonian actress and television presenter

Estonian feminine given names